Tellusboutyourself (stylized in all lowercase) is the second studio album by South Korean singer Yerin Baek. It was released digitally through Blue Vinyl on December 10, 2020, and physically on January 8, 2021, by Dreamus. Written and recorded in English, the album is primarily a pop-R&B record. It contains fourteen tracks including the double title tracks "Hate You" and "0415", which were released simultaneously with the album's digital release.

Background and release
On November 23, 2020, Baek Yerin officially announced that she would release her second album Tellusboutyourself on December 10. The album contains 14 songs, including the title songs "0415" and "Hate You". The album attracted attention to Yerin's foretelling of a new musical transformation, showcasing a wider world of music from existing music and encompassing genres such as R&B, deep house, synth-pop, modern rock and dream pop.

Critical reception

Billboard chose Tellusboutyourself as one of "The 10 Best K-pop Albums of 2020 (Critics' Picks)". Contributor Joshua Minsoo Kim wrote, "You can hear the sound of [t]ellusboutyourself from saying the title out loud: it’s casual, conversational, intimate. As always, Yerin Baek sings with a firm conviction that belies her graceful vocals, transforming the simplest of lyrics into immersive pools of emotion. The truths she relays can be hard to swallow, so she allows gauzy instrumentation to provide a welcoming atmosphere.".

Track listing

Notes

 "You're So Lonely Now, So You Need Me Back by Your Side Again", "I Am Not Your Ocean Anymore", "Hate You", "I'll Be Your Family!", "I'm in Love" are stylized in sentence case.
 "Homesweethome" is stylized in all caps with quotation marks.

Charts

Weekly charts

Monthly charts

Sales

Awards and nominations

Release history

References 

2020 albums
Deep house albums
Rhythm and blues albums by South Korean artists
Rock albums by South Korean artists
Synth-pop albums by South Korean artists